Aditi Dev Sharma is an Indian television and film actress known for her portrayal of Gangaa Shukla in &TV's Gangaa and Mauli in Colors TV's Silsila Badalte Rishton Ka.

Early life 
She hails from North-west Punjab in a brahmin family Her family lives in Lucknow.

Career
Sharma is the winner of talent-hunt show India's Best Cinestars Ki Khoj that premiered on Zee TV in 2004.

She has appeared in advertisements for various brands like Tata Sky, Domino's Pizza, Colgate, Fair & Lovely, Parachute Oil, Bank of India, Stayfree, Tanishq, Moov, Dabur honey, Taaza tea, Britannia, Reliance and Tata Venture.

From 2015 to 2017, Sharma portrayed Gangaa Shukla as lawyer in &TV's Gangaa opposite Vishal Vashishtha and Shakti Anand.

From 2018 to 2019, she played Dr. Mauli in Colors TV's Silsila Badalte Rishton Ka opposite Drashti Dhami,  Shakti Arora and Kinshuk Mahajan

In 2015, she debut in Punjabi Film Angrej opposite Amrinder Gill. 

Since December 2022, Sharma is portraying the lead role in Sony Entertainment Television's drama series Katha Ankahee opposite Adnan Khan.

Filmography

Films

Television

Awards and nominations

See also
 List of Indian television actresses

References

External links
 
 
 

1983 births
Indian film actresses
Actresses in Hindi cinema
Actresses in Telugu cinema
Actresses in Punjabi cinema
Indian television actresses
Living people
Actresses in Hindi television
21st-century Indian actresses